Tournee is the eighth album and the second live album by the German jazz rock band Kraan. It was recorded in four venues between March and November 1979.

Track listing
 "Borgward" – 8:16
 "Almrausch" – 5:57
 "Peterchens Reise" – 7:01
 "Vollgas ahoi" – 7:56
 "Yaqui Yagua" – 7:54
 "Silky way" – 4:31

Personnel
 Udo Dahmen - drums
 Hellmut Hattler - bass
 Peter Wolbrandt - guitar, vocals
 Ingo Bischof - keyboards

Kraan albums
1980 live albums
Harvest Records live albums